Old 97 may refer to:
Wreck of the Old 97, 1903 American train wreck of the Fast Mail, which was itself known as "Old 97", and subsequent ballad
Old 97's, American alternative rock group active 1993–present